The Collegiate Conference of the South men's basketball tournament is the annual conference basketball championship tournament for the NCAA Division III Collegiate Conference of the South. The tournament's inaugural edition was held in 2023. It is a single-elimination tournament and seeding is based on regular conference season records.

The winner, declared conference champion, will only begin to receive an automatic bid to the NCAA Men's Division III Basketball Championship in 2024.

Results

Championship records

Berea, Covenant, Huntingdon, LaGrange, and Piedmont have not yet qualified for the CCS tournament finals.

References

NCAA Division III men's basketball conference tournaments
Collegiate Conference of the South
Recurring sporting events established in 2023